The 1897 Washington and Lee Generals football team was an American football team that represented the Washington and Lee University as an independent during the 1897 college football season. Led by captain D. M. Barclay, who played at right tackle, Washington and Lee compiled a record of 3–1. Smith Alford played at right halfback. The team had no head coach.

Schedule

References

Washington and Lee
Washington and Lee Generals football seasons
Washington and Lee Generals football